For information on all Tennessee Technological University sports, see Tennessee Tech Golden Eagles

The Tennessee Tech Golden Eagles football program is the intercollegiate American football team for the Tennessee Technological University located in the U.S. state of Tennessee. The team competes in the NCAA Division I Football Championship Subdivision (FCS) and are members of the Ohio Valley Conference. The school's first football team was fielded in 1922. The team plays its home games at the 16,500 seat Tucker Stadium. They are coached by Dewayne Alexander.

Conference championships 
Tennessee Tech has won ten conference championships, five shared and five outright. Their ten Ohio Valley titles are the 2nd most in the conference, behind only Eastern Kentucky. 

† Co-championship

FCS Playoffs results
The Golden Eagles have appeared in the FCS playoffs one time with an overall record of 0–1.

Bowl games
The Golden Eagles have appeared in three bowl games with an overall record of 0–3.

Head coaches
 Loyall Duyck (1922)
 Preston Vaughn Overall (1923–1946, 1952–1953)
 Hooper Eblen (1947–1949)
 Star Wood (1950–1951)
 Wilburn Tucker (1954–1967)
 Don Wade (1968–1982)
 Gary Darnell (1983–1985) 
 Jim Ragland (1986–1995)
 Mike Hennigan (1996–2006)
 Watson Brown (2007–2015)
 Marcus Satterfield (2016–2017)
 Dewayne Alexander (2018–present)

Notable former players

 Barry Wilmore
 Larry Schreiber
 Elois Grooms
 Mike Hennigan
 Lonnie Warwick
 Jim Youngblood
 Da'Rick Rogers
 Howard Stidham
 Frank Omiyale

Year-by-year results

 1999: 5-5
 2000: 8-3
 2001: 7-3 (Did not play Samford due to 9/11)
 2002: 5-7
 2003: 
 2004: 
 2005: 
 2006: 
 2007: 4–7
 2008: 3–8
 2009: 6–5
 2010: 5–6
 2011: 7–4
 2012: 3–8
 2013: 5–7
 2014: 5–7
 2015: 4–7
 2016: 5–6
 2017: 1–10
 2018: 1–10
 2019: 6–6
 2020: 2-5
 2021: 5-6

Future non-conference opponents 
Announced schedules as of December 8, 2022.

References

External links
 

 
American football teams established in 1922
1922 establishments in Tennessee